Bartłomiej Wdowik (born 25 September 2000) is a Polish professional footballer who plays as a left-back or a left winger for Jagiellonia Białystok.

References

Living people
2000 births
Association football defenders
Association football midfielders
Polish footballers
Poland youth international footballers
Poland under-21 international footballers
Ruch Chorzów players
Odra Opole players
Jagiellonia Białystok players
Ekstraklasa players
I liga players
II liga players
III liga players
People from Olkusz